Top Third Ventures is a limited liability company headquartered in Mauritius with a subsidiary registered in Kenya that deals mainly with carbon credits and Bottom of the Pyramid consumer segmentation. The company provides financiers, manufacturers, and distributors of efficient cook stoves access to carbon finance through its carbon credit programme, which is accessible though a mobile app.

History 
Top Third Ventures was founded on 9 November 2011, by Lucas Belenky and Björn Hammar in Nairobi, Kenya. Björn Hammar, a Finnish national, met Lucas Belenky, a United States national, several months before during a professional hiatus while traveling through sub-Saharan Africa.  A chance meeting with an efficient cook stove designer led to an introduction to Lucas who was a senior associate with KPMG East Africa's Sustainability Advisory Services at the time. Björn and Lucas had their first meeting at the Westgate shopping mall.

Top Third Ventures original business was to design, market, and sell an efficient cook stove with brand name Baker for the rural consumer market in Kenya. Two additional business divisions grew out of the direct sale of the Baker cook stove: the Business-To-Business division providing other cook stove manufacturers and distributors access to carbon finance and the Big Data division. The retail sale of the Baker cook stove below cost of production was possible through carbon financing. Top Third Ventures registered the Top Third Ventures Stove Programme, a program of activities under the Clean Development Mechanism of the United Nations Framework Convention on Climate Change (UNFCCC). The programme was registered on 27 December 2012 and allows Top Third Ventures to earn Certified Emissions Reductions from cook stove activities for a 28-year period. To streamline the realization of carbon credits, track sales, and achieve market segmentation, a mobile app was set up on Android and linked to a backend data visualization and data analysis tool. The aggregation of large amounts of cookstove user data is the foundation of Top Third Ventures' Big Data division.

Top Third Ventures market entry strategy was through its own Baker cook stove. Claesson Koivisto Rune developed the design of the Baker cookstove to emphasize aesthetic appeal, usability, and cultural conformity. In early 2013 the first 200 Baker cook stoves were manufactured in Nairobi and sold through Top Third Ventures' flagship store in Laikipia County, Kenya. The cook stoves were sold from a refurbished shipping container and the sales team was composed on local village motorcycle taxis that were given sample products. The Baker cook stoves were sold for a retail price of $25. Sales data and customer information was recorded through Top3 Tracker.

After encountering quality problems in the domestically produced Baker cookstoves and unable to raise working capital to establish production overseas at sufficient economies of scale, Top Third Ventures focused on the Business-to-Business and Big Data divisions of the company by working with existing financiers, manufacturers, and distributors of cook stoves around the developing, to provide them access to Top Third Ventures' carbon credit programme.

On 12 September 2012, Top Third Ventures Global was incorporated in Mauritius as a limited liability company. The restructuring reduced the exposure of Top Third Ventures' operations to political risk from the upcoming Kenyan General Election, 2013.

Business model 
Through TTV's carbon credit programme the company reduces the cost of accessing carbon finance and lowers the time required to certify an efficient cook stove activity for carbon finance.

References 

Companies based in Nairobi